Glenn McCrory (born 23 September 1964) is a British former professional boxer who competed from 1984 to 1993. He held the IBF cruiserweight title from 1989 to 1990, and at regional level held the British and Commonwealth cruiserweight title between 1987 and 1988. He has worked as a commentator and pundit for Sky Sports since 1989.

Professional boxing career

Early career
McCrory was born in Annfield Plain in County Durham. He made his professional debut in February 1984, scoring a 1st round knock out against Barry Ellis.  Over the next 15 months he fought a further 12 times, winning on each occasion before suffering his first defeat against John Westgarth in September 1985.  The defeat was to be the first in a series of losses for McCrory as he went on to lose a further four fights out of his next five.  In November 1986 this run came to an end when a visit to Louisville, Kentucky saw him get back to winning ways against the inexperienced Joe Adams.

British and Commonwealth champion
The Adams win provided the springboard for a run of form which would take him first to the Commonwealth cruiserweight title and then to the British.  Four straight victories set him up for a shot at Zambian Chisanda Mutti, the reigning Commonwealth champion, in Gateshead, Tyne and Wear on 4 September 1987.  The fight went the distance with McCrory picking up a points win.  In January 1988 he defended his title for the first time and picked up the British belt with a win over Tee Jay in Wandsworth.  A further defence of both titles occurred in April 1988 when he returned to Gateshead to defeat challenger Lou Gent.

World champion
Three more wins over journeymen opponents followed the Gent victory before, in June 1989, McCrory challenged Patrick Lumumba for the vacant IBF cruiserweight title, winning the belt via a unanimous points decision.  He made one defence of the belt against Siza Makathini in October 1989 before losing it to American Jeff Lampkin in March 1990.

Further challenges
Following the Lampkin defeat, McCrory moved up to heavyweight and in September 1991 lost in a challenge to future world champion Lennox Lewis, failing in his bid to win Lewis's British and European titles.  Two victories and a draw against journeymen followed the Lewis defeat before a trip to Moscow in July 1993 resulted in an unsuccessful attempt to win back his IBF belt, losing over 12 rounds to reigning champion Alfred Cole.  The fight was to prove his last as a professional as McCrory retired from the sport with a record of won 30, lost 8, drawn 1.

Post-boxing career
Since retirement, McCrory has become a television commentator and occasional actor, employed by Sky Television as the long time sidekick of Ian Darke. He has also made occasional appearances as an actor on television and on stage.

McCrory gained a professional trainers license and opened a gym in the Newbiggin Hall Estate in Newcastle.  Wider ambitions for the gym included McCrory's wish for it to be used as a possible training camp for the Team GB boxers before the 2012 Summer Olympics.

Professional boxing record

References

External links
 

1964 births
Living people
People from Annfield Plain
Sportspeople from County Durham
English male boxers
Cruiserweight boxers
Heavyweight boxers
International Boxing Federation champions
British Boxing Board of Control champions
Commonwealth Boxing Council champions